Desmodium cuspidatum, common name large-bracted tick-trefoil, is a species of  plant in the legume family, Fabaceae. It is native to North America.

Conservation status
The species is listed as endangered in Connecticut by state authorities. It is also endangered in Vermont and threatened in Massachusetts.

References

cuspidatum
Flora of North America